Psammphiletria nasuta is a species of loach catfish endemic to the Central African Republic where it is found in the Ubangui River.  It grows to a length of 2.3 cm.

References 

 

Amphiliidae
Endemic fauna of the Central African Republic
Fish described in 2003
Taxa named by Tyson R. Roberts